The 1998 MIAT Mongolian Airlines crash was a domestic flight that crashed on 26 May 1998, killing all on board. The flight departed Erdenet Airport at approximately 09:17 on a flight to Mörön, with 26 passengers and 2 crew. Approximately 13 minutes after departure, while the plane was climbing to cruising altitude, it struck the top of a 6,500 ft mountain, killing all passengers and crew. Of the 26 passengers, 14 were adults and 12 were children.

The aircraft
The Harbin Y-12, registration JU-1017 (cn 0064), first flew in 1992. The aircraft was designed to hold only 19 passengers, but a government representative said the plane was not overloaded.

References

Airliner accidents and incidents caused by pilot error
Aviation accidents and incidents in 1998
Transport disasters in Mongolia
1998 in Mongolia
May 1998 events in Asia
Orkhon Province
1998 disasters in Mongolia